The women's 3000 metres race of the 2014–15 ISU Speed Skating World Cup 3, arranged in Sportforum Hohenschönhausen, in Berlin, Germany, was held on 5 December 2014.

Ireen Wüst of the Netherlands won, followed by Marije Joling of the Netherlands in second place, and Martina Sáblíková of the Czech Republic in third place. Carlijn Achtereekte of the Netherlands won Division B.

Marina Zueva of Belarus and Saskia Alusalu of Estonia set new national records, skating in the B Division.

Results
The race took place on Friday, 5 December, with Division B scheduled in the morning session, at 12:10, and Division A scheduled in the afternoon session, at 16:00.

Division A

Division B

Notes: NR = national record.

References

Women 3000
3